Bora Aksu (born in Turkey) is a Turkish fashion designer based in London, England. Aksu set up his fashion label upon graduation from his MA at Central Saint Martins. He has showcased his collections in London Fashion Week since 2003. His collection is stocked in Selfridges, Wolf & Badger and Liberty & Co in London and he has 61 stores, primarily in Asia. He has also prepared seven window displays at Selfridges and is a 4 times NEWGEN recipient.

Fashion journalists describe Aksu as having a dark, romantic aesthetic and as being a longtime favorite of London Fashion Week. In September 2020, Aksu was the first live show during London Fashion Week, and one of only four live shows held during the event that year due to the global pandemic. Aksu says his collections are "inspired by romantic women who are fragile but self-confident."

References

External links
 

Turkish fashion designers
Alumni of Central Saint Martins
Turkish emigrants to the United Kingdom
Living people
Year of birth missing (living people)